
Borstal Boy is a play adapted by Frank McMahon from the 1958 autobiographical novel of Irish nationalist Brendan Behan of the same title. The play debuted in 1967 at the Abbey Theatre in Dublin, with Frank Grimes as the young Behan.  McMahon won a New York Drama Critics' Circle Award in 1970 and Tony Award in 1970 for his adaptation.

Plot synopsis
The title takes its name from the borstal, a British juvenile jail, at Hollesley Bay. The book was originally banned in the Republic of Ireland for obscenity.

The story is a recounting of Behan's imprisonment at Hollesley Bay for carrying explosives into the United Kingdom, with intent to cause explosions on a mission for the I.R.A. A young, idealistic Behan, over the three years of his sentence, softening his radical stance and warming to the other prisoners.

Film adaptations

The novel was adapted for film by Peter Sheridan and Nye Heron in 2000.

Further reading

References

External links
 
 
 

1970 plays
Broadway plays
Drama Desk Award-winning plays
Irish plays
Tony Award-winning plays